Edward Howard, 9th Duke of Norfolk (5 June 1686 – 20 September 1777), of Worksop Manor in Nottinghamshire and of Norfolk House in London, was a British peer, politician and hereditary Earl Marshal.

Origins
He was the third of the five sons of Lord Thomas Howard (d.1689), of Worksop (younger brother of Henry Howard, 7th Duke of Norfolk (d.1701), both sons of Henry Howard, 6th Duke of Norfolk (d.1684)) by his wife Mary Elizabeth Savile (d.1732). An elder brother Henry Howard (1684-1720) was Roman Catholic Bishop-elect before his death. His younger brothers were Richard Howard (1687-1722) who died in Rome, where he was a Canon of St. Peter Basilica and Philip Howard (1688-1750).

Career

He took part in the Jacobite Rising of 1715, one of several English noblemen to do so. Through the intercession of his brother, he escaped the punishment for high treason. He succeeded as 9th Duke of Norfolk in 1732, after the death of his childless elder brother Thomas Howard, 8th Duke of Norfolk. Largely at the instigation of his wife, a fellow Roman Catholic and a talented and highly regarded interior designer and embroiderer, he rebuilt Norfolk House in St James's Square in London on a grand scale and commenced the rebuilding of Worksop on a palatial scale, to rival Blenheim Palace. The latter project was abandoned after the completion of only one wing following the death of the couple's beloved nephew and heir apparent Edward Howard (1743/4-1767), the son of the Duke's younger brother Philip Howard (1688-1750) of Buckenham Tofts, Norfolk, by his second wife Henrietta Blount (d.1782), a sister of his wife. Edward died in 1767, aged 23, due to a fever he caught while playing tennis not fully recovered from measles. The Duchess was affected "almost to distraction and she never recovered from the blow". The couple realised that their next heir was a distant male cousin they hardly knew and who was a "depressing" contrast to Edward.

Marriage

On 26 November 1727 he married Mary Blount (before 1712–27 May 1773), one of the three daughters and heiresses of Edward Blount (d.1726) of Blagdon in the parish of Paignton in Devon, by his wife Anne Guise, a daughter of Sir John Guise, 2nd Baronet (c. 1654–1695) of Elmore in Gloucestershire. The Blount-Guise marriage was commemorated by the surviving heraldic overmantel above the fireplace of the great hall of Blagdon manor house. This shows the initials "EB"  and displays the arms of Blount (Barry nebuly of six or and sable) impaling Gules, seven mascles vair 3,3,1 (Guise) above a scroll inscribed with a Latin motto Lux Tua Via Mea ("Your light is my path") with the date "1708". James Cook named Norfolk Island in honour of the Duchess of Norfolk in 1774, although he did not know at the time that she was already dead. Howard had no progeny by Mary Blount.

Death and succession
He died on 20 September 1777, aged 91, without a male heir, when several of his titles (the Dukedom of Norfolk, the Earldoms of Norfolk, Arundel and Surrey, and the Barony of Maltravers) passed to his second cousin (whom he hardly knew) Charles Howard, 10th Duke of Norfolk, a grandson of Charles Howard of Greystoke, Cumberland, a brother of the 6th Duke. The Earldom of Norwich and Barony of Howard of Castle Rising, which were created for his grandfather, the 6th Duke of Norfolk, became extinct. Finally, several old English baronies created by writ including Baron Mowbray, Baron Segrave Baron Howard, Braose of Gower, Greystock, Ferrers of Wemme, Baron Talbot, Strange of Blackmere, Furnivall and Giffard of Brimmesfield, fell into abeyance among the two daughters of his younger brother Philip Howard (1688-1750) of Buckenham Tofts in Norfolk. Most of these passed via Philip's eldest daughter Winifred Howard (1726-1753), who married William Stourton, 16th Baron Stourton (1704–1781).

Family tree 

|-

|-

|-

|-

References

1686 births
1777 deaths
17th-century English nobility
18th-century English nobility
309
Edward Howard, 9th Duke of Norfolk
English Roman Catholics
Earls Marshal
27
306
7th Earl of Norfolk
Earls of Norwich
Barons Mowbray
17
24
Barons Furnivall
Barons Talbot
Barons Strange of Blackmere